Young Religious Unitarian Universalists (YRUU) is a term used within the Unitarian Universalist Association (UUA) in the United States and formerly the Canadian Unitarian Council. YRUU was an organization at the continental level primarily run by youth, ranging in age from 14 to 20, with mentoring adult partners. The continental organization of YRUU ended in 2008, but the term is still used by certain active youth groups and conferences at the congregational and district levels.

The continental YRUU goals included youth empowerment, social activism and building leadership qualities. YRUU members often made their presence known in public demonstrations; for instance, in the June 23, 2006 protest in St. Louis, Missouri against Victoria's Secret for allegedly printing its catalogues on paper from endangered North American forests.

In February 2008, UUA President William G. Sinkford, in a letter to the YRUU Steering Committee, announced there would be no further funding for continental level YRUU at the end of the fiscal year. "There is broad consensus that the current structure for continental youth ministry is not serving our faith well," wrote Sinkford. "It is true that continental YRUU, as we have known it, will be replaced at some point by a new structure that will serve us better." Two months later, the UUA Board of Trustees announced it would cease its funding for the continental level YRUU activities in June 2008 and refocus its North American youth ministry endeavors. The Youth Ministry Working Group (YMWG) was appointed and charged with recommending a strategic imagination and framework for Unitarian Universalist youth ministry. The YMWG concluded in 2009 and issued a final set of recommendations of concrete actions that could bring forth a vision of vibrant, congregationally-based youth ministry and truly multigenerational faith communities.

Beginning in 1982, continental YRUU published the newspaper Synapse, which appeared three times a year.  In 2005, budget cuts forced the publication to be switched to two online issues that were compiled into a single print edition. In 2007, the UUA's Office of Youth Ministries halted publication, identifying a lack of submissions and staffing, and announced that Synapse would be replaced by a newsletter that would be published three times a year.  The UUA's Office of Youth and Young Adult Ministries now publishes a monthly e-newsletter distributed by email and an ongoing blog, Blue Boat, which is open to submissions about topics of interest to and/or written by UU youth, young adults, or their adult allies.

See also

 List of youth empowerment organizations
 List of youth organizations
 Youth empowerment
 Youth-adult partnership

References

Further reading

External links
 Youth Ministry—Unitarian Universalist Association Website
 Youth Ministry—Canadian Unitarian Council Website
 Archive of the old YRUU website—Internet Archive Wayback Machine
 Archive of Synapse, the YRUU newspaper—Internet Archive Wayback Machine

1982 establishments in the United States
Child-related organizations in the United States
Religious organizations established in 1982
Unitarian Universalism in Canada
Unitarian Universalism in the United States
Unitarian Universalist organizations
Youth religious organizations
Youth-led organizations